Faralako  is a town and sub-prefecture in the Mandiana Prefecture in the Kankan Region of eastern Guinea. As of 2014 it had a population of 24,371 people.

References

Sub-prefectures of the Kankan Region